Yohann Lacroix (born February 1, 1985) is a French former professional footballer who played as a goalkeeper.

Club career
Born in Thonon-les-Bains, France, Lacroix began his career in the junior ranks of Auxerre. In 2003, he signed with  Lille OSC and worked his way up through the ranks into the first team, signing a professional contract in 2005. He made his first appearance for the Lille first team, playing in a UEFA Intertoto Cup match against Dinamo Minsk in 2004. He was loaned to Championnat National side L'Entente SSG for the 2006-07 season where he made 23 appearances.

After a stint in Greece, he tried his adventure in Singapore by signing with Étoile FC. With this club, he won the League Cup and the Singapore championship title in 2010. He set a new league clean sheet record by not conceding a single goal for 1,045 minutes in the season.

In June 2011 he joined top Singapore club Tampines Rovers with whom he won the championship for a second time, ending a seven-year title drought for the Rovers. With this new success, he became the first player in the history of the Singapore Premier League to win the league title both with a foreign franchise (Étoile FC in 2010) and a local franchise (Tampines Rovers in 2011).

In January 2012 he signed a three-year contract with his former team Étoile FC. A few days before the championship began the franchise in disagreement with the Football Association of Singapore decided to withdraw from the Singapore Premier League.

After an injury to their number one keeper Sean O'Neill against Linfield on 12 January 2013, Crusaders of Northern Ireland signed Lacroix and Craig Hyland in time for the club's next match against Ballymena United. In doing so, he became the first French player to represent the club. With Hyland departing after one game, Lacroix made his debut in a 2–1 victory over Linfield in the Irish Cup on 22 January 2013.

He rapidly became a fan's favorite and Crusaders' supporters developed a chant for him during his time at Seaview; "Don't sell Lacroix", to the tune of Billy Ray Cyrus' song Achy Breaky Heart. On 1 January 2014 he joined Ballymena United on loan.

Post-playing career 

During his playing career, he studied a Master of Science in Sports Business at the Ulster Business School in Belfast. Shortly after graduated, he retired from professional football to join UEFA marketing agency CAA Eleven in January 2015. He now works for the commercial department of the International Olympic Committee based in Lausanne, Switzerland.

Honours
Etoile
 S.League: 2010, 2011
 Singapore League Cup: 2010

References

External links
 
 Yohann Lacroix Interview
 Yohann Lacroix, a footballer like no other

1985 births
Living people
French footballers
French expatriate footballers
Singapore Premier League players
AJ Auxerre players
Lille OSC players
Entente SSG players
Crusaders F.C. players
Tampines Rovers FC players
Association football goalkeepers
Sportspeople from Haute-Savoie
Expatriate footballers in Singapore
Expatriate association footballers in Northern Ireland
French expatriate sportspeople in Northern Ireland
French expatriate sportspeople in Singapore
Étoile FC players
Footballers from Auvergne-Rhône-Alpes